James Kennedy (23 April 1949 – 26 October 2020) was a Scottish cricketer and gynaecologist. He played in four matches for the Scotland cricket team, two of them with first-class status. The first one was against Ireland in 1970, and the second against a touring Pakistan side in 1971.

References

External links
 

1949 births
2020 deaths
Cricketers from Glasgow
Scottish cricketers
Scottish gynaecologists